Hartmut Höll (born November 24, 1952) is a German pianist and music professor.

Biography
Höll was born in Heilbronn. He trained in Stuttgart, Milan and Munich, specializing in art song accompaniment. From the time of his début in 1973 he has worked closely with the soprano (later mezzo-soprano) Mitsuko Shirai, winning the Hugo Wolf Competition in Vienna, the Robert Schumann Competition at Zwickau (1974) and international prizes in 1976 in Athens and 's-Hertogenbosch. For many years their recitals have been acclaimed throughout Europe and the United States, as well as in Japan, the Middle East and South America. They have also recorded extensively together.

Höll was also frequent accompanist to Dietrich Fischer-Dieskau, from 1982 until the singer's retirement in 1993. Their recording of Beethoven's songs won special praise for Höll's finely shaded playing. Another close associate has been the viola player Tabea Zimmermann, and they too have made some remarkable recordings, including sonatas by Brahms and Shostakovich,.

Since 2001 he has accompanied Renée Fleming for recitals in Europe, Australia, Asia and the United States. He has also worked with other singers, such as Urszula Kryger, Yvonne Naef, Jochen Kowalski, René Pape, Christoph Prégardien, Hermann Prey, Jadwiga Rappé, Peter Schreier, and Roman Trekel, and the clarinettist Sabine Meyer.

Teaching
Höll is professor at the Hochschule für Musik Karlsruhe and a visiting professor in Salzburg and Helsinki. He also serves as artistic director of the International Hugo Wolf Academy in Stuttgart.

Writing
 WortMusik, Staccato, Düsseldorf 2012

Selected discography
Schoeck: Lieder (1986) Claves Records
Mozart: 21 Songs (with Mitsuko Shirai) (1986) Capriccio Records
Mendelssohn: Lieder (with Dietrich Fischer-Dieskau) (1991) Claves Records
Schoeck: Das Hold Bescheiden (1993) Claves Records
Weber: Lieder (1993) Claves Records
Ravel: Songs (with Dietrich Fischer-Dieskau) (1993) Orfeo Records
Schoeck:  Das stille Leuchten (1994) Claves Records
Richard Strauss: Songs (with Mitsuko Shirai) (1994) Cappricio Records
Lieder (Songs) with Viola (1995) Capriccio Records
Schubert Edition: Die Schőne Műllerin; Winterreise (1997) Capriccio Records
Schumann: Frauenliebe und –Leben Op. 42; Liederkreis Op. 39 (1997) Camerata Records
Norbert Burgmũller: Chamber Music (2000) MDG Records
Victor Ullman: Lieder (2001) Capriccio Records
Brahms: Viola Sonatas; Schumann: Märchenbilder (2003) EMI Classics
Schumann: Sonata Op. 105, Märchenbilder, Romanzen, Fantasiestűcke, Adagio and Allegro (2004) Capriccio Records
Schubert: Lieder (2004) Apex Records
Ludwig Thulle: Selected Songs (2012) Capriccio Records
German Duets: Mendelssohn, Schumann, Brahms (2014) Dux Records

Footnotes

References
.

External links
Discography on Allmusic.com
Discography on Naxos.com

1952 births
Living people
German pianists
People from Heilbronn